Club de Deportes Pintana were a Chilean football club based in the commune of La Pintana, Santiago. They lastly played in the third level of Chilean football, the Segunda División.

The club were founded on February 18, 2009 as Municipal La Pintana and played five seasons in the Tercera División and one season in the Tercera B.

At the end of 2017, the club was disbanded after being relegated to the fourth-tier amateur level (the Tercera División).

Seasons played
 3 seasons in Segunda División
 5 seasons in Tercera División
 1 season in Tercera B

Titles
 Tercera División B: 2009

See also
 Chilean football league system

Pintana
Pintana
Pintana
Pintana
Sport in Santiago Metropolitan Region
2009 establishments in Chile
2017 disestablishments in Chile